Jim James Ovia  (born 4 November 1951) is a Nigerian businessman, he is the founder of Zenith Bank which he founded in 1990.

Early life 
Jim Ovia holds a master's degree in Business Administration from the University of Louisiana, Monroe, Louisiana, USA in 1979 and a B.Sc. degree in Business Administration from Southern University, Baton Rouge, Louisiana, USA in 1977. He is also an Alumnus of Harvard Business School.

Career 
He is the founder of Zenith Bank Plc, Nigeria's tier-1 bank and one of the most profitable financial institutions in Nigeria until 2010, when he moved into the chairman role. He was the recipient of a Nigerian national honor.

During two decades of leadership, he helped position the bank as one of the largest and most profitable in Africa.

Ovia is the founder of Visafone Communications Limited and the chairman of both the Nigerian Software Development Initiative (NSDI) and the National Information Technology Advisory Council (NITAC). He is a member of the Honorary International Investor Council as well as the Digital Bridge Institute (DBI). He is the Chairman of Cyberspace Network Limited. He was awarded an honorary doctorate degree in the 50th convocation ceremony of the University of Lagos.

In September 2018, Ovia announced the publication of his book Africa, Rise and Shine published with ForbesBooks.

Leadership Roles 
He is a member of the Governing Council of Lagos State University, Lagos and a member of the Board of Trustees, Redeemer's University For Nations, Lagos. He was a member of the Governing Council of the Nigerian Investment Promotion Commission (1999–2007) and served on the board of American International School, Lagos (2001–2003).

Ovia headed numerous NGO's  at various times including serving as the first President of the Nigeria Internet Group (2001–2003). He is the founder and Chairman of Mankind United to Support Total Education (MUSTE), a philanthropic organization focused on providing scholarships for the less privileged. He is the founder of the Youth Empowerment / ICT Foundation, which focuses on improving the socioeconomic welfare of Nigerian youths by inspiring and motivating them to embrace Information and communication technology.

Award 
In October 2022, a Nigerian national honour of Commander of the Order of the Federal Republic (CFR) was conferred on him by President Muhammadu Buhari.

References

1951 births
Living people
Southern University alumni
University of Louisiana at Monroe alumni
Harvard Business School alumni
20th-century Nigerian businesspeople
21st-century Nigerian businesspeople
People from Delta State
Nigerian company founders
Nigerian bankers
Lagos State University people
Nigerian chairpersons of corporations